Zachary Mitchell Banks (born December 15, 1997) is an American racing driver currently in the NASCAR recruitment pipeline for the NASCAR Whelen Euro Series, and a college student. Banks has recorded over 90 career race wins.

Early life
Born to Cuban immigrant mother Jacqueline and Irish-American father Jason, Banks grew up in Miami, Florida, where he attended George Washington Carver Middle School, and later Christopher Columbus High School, Immaculata-La Salle High School, and Coral Gables Senior High School, where he graduated. Banks graduated with honors and served as president of his class during his junior year of high school. Banks began attending Florida State University in 2016, pursuing a degree in management information systems.

Racing career

2012 - 2014
Banks competed in his first karting race in October 2012. He recorded his first win in October 2013 at Homestead-Miami Speedway in TAG Junior. His first championship came in early 2014 with International Racing, shortly after turning 16.

2015 - present
Banks' karting career progressed to the international stage with top-10 finishes in both the Cold Stone Florida Winter Tour and the United States ROK National Championship in 2015 and 2016. He won the 2016 Florida Karting Championship Series  at Homestead-Miami Speedway in TAG Senior and the 2016 Florida State championship  in ROK Senior. Banks began testing Le Mans sports cars in 2017 at Homestead-Miami Speedway and Daytona International Speedway. In mid-2017, Banks took a brief hiatus from racing to further his studies at Florida State.

Banks resumed racing in September 2018, winning his first 8 races, consecutively. Banks followed up his championships with another championship in the Monticello Racing Series in December 2019. Banks won 17 races in 2019.

In August 2019, Banks became an officially licensed Sports Car Club of America (SCCA) and International Motor Sports Association (IMSA) race car driver.

In December 2020, Banks repeated as champion at Monticello in ROK Senior with a 15-win season, shortened by the Covid-19 Pandemic.

Banks has been featured as a guest on several podcasts and interviews since September 2018.

NASCAR Whelen Euro Series
Banks was selected for the 2020 NASCAR Whelen Euro Series Driver Recruitment Program in Fontenay-le-Comte, France. Banks signed a letter of intent to drive for Hendriks Motorsport for the 2020 season. However, due to the economic effects of the COVID-19 pandemic, the plans have since been postponed.

Personal life
Banks speaks Spanish, English, and Italian. Banks has competed and placed on the podium of multiple ultramarathon races, including winning the 2020 Hellcat 50K in the male 20-24 category. Banks has also competed in several triathlons, duathlons, and other endurance events. Since testing positive for COVID-19 in June 2020, Banks has been sidelined from endurance competition due to ongoing complications from the virus.

External links
  
 Official fanpage
Official Twitter
YouTube channel
 Instagram
 Official LinkedIn

References

</ref><ref>

1997 births
Living people
American racing drivers
Racing drivers from Miami
People from South Miami, Florida